Kira Geil (born 12 June 1985 in Bridgend, Wales) is a former competitive ice dancer who represented Austria with Tobias Eisenbauer.  

In her early career, Geil represented Great Britain with Andrew Smykowski. She moved from Great Britain to Austria in 2009 and teamed up with Dmitri Matsjuk to represent Austria. In 2010, she teamed up with Tobias Eisenbauer.

Programs

With Eisenbauer

With Matsjuk

With Smykowski

Results

With Eisenbauer

With Matsjuk

With Smykowski

References

External links

External links
Official homepage for Kira Geil & Tobias Eisenbauer

Austrian female ice dancers
British female ice dancers
1985 births
Sportspeople from Bridgend
Living people